Miralda paulbartschi is a species of sea snail, a marine gastropod mollusc in the family Pyramidellidae, the pyrams and their allies.

Distributions
This species occurs in the Pacific Ocean off Hawaii.

References

External links
 To World Register of Marine Species
 Sea Slugs of Hawaii: Miralda paulbartschi

Pyramidellidae
Gastropods described in 1918